The BeSeatSmart Program is a federal grant-based program supported by the Governor's Highway Safety Program, Vermont, and hosted by The Vermont Department of Health.  BeSeatSmart provides child passenger safety seats, hands on help, advice, consultations, presentations, training, materials and support to residents of Vermont.  BeSeatSmart provides best practice advice as given and sourced by the American Academy of Pediatrics (AAP) and the National Highway Traffic Safety Administration (NHTSA).

Mission
Vermont’s child passenger safety program, BeSeatSmart, aims to increase and sustain safety seat and seat belt use for children 0–18.  This is done through annual training of new technicians, yearly training of existing technicians, creating and supporting fitting stations, holding open-to-the-public inspections, a telephone hot-line for all things CPS (Child Passenger Safety) related, a website, hands on help for children with special medical needs, displays at public events and media campaigns, and distribution of low-cost car seats to children in need and at risk.

History
BeSeatSmart started in 1994 as the KISS (Kids in Safety Seats) program.  The program began in partnership with the Vermont Department of Health and Grand Union Supermarkets.  This small program, trail-blazed by its originator, J. Michele Laberge, grew into an award-winning, ground-breaking child passenger safety program.  Vermont received more than 6,000 free seats from Ford Motor Company, General Motors and Safe Kids Worldwide due to the performance of the program.  Since its inception, more than 12,000 seats have been distributed to Vermont families in all 14 counties of Vermont.

Law
Current Vermont Child Passenger Safety Law reads as follows: 
“23 V.S.A. § 1258...
Child Restraint Systems
Primary Law

(a) No person shall operate a motor vehicle, other than a type I school bus, in this state upon a public highway unless every occupant under age 18 is properly restrained in a federally approved child passenger restraining system as defined in 49 C.F.R. § 571.213 (1993) or a federally approved safety belt, as follows:
(1) all children under the age of one, and all children weighing less than 20 pounds, regardless of age, shall be restrained in a rear-facing position, properly secured in a federally approved child passenger restraining system, which shall not be installed in front of an active air bag;
(2) a child weighing more than 20 pounds, and who is one year of age or older and under the age of eight years, shall be restrained in a child passenger restraining system; and 
(3) a child eight through 18 years of age shall be restrained in a safety belt system or a child passenger restraining system.
Exemptions
(b) A person shall not be adjudicated in violation of this section if:
(1) the motor vehicle is regularly used to transport passengers for hire except a motor vehicle owned or operated by a day care facility; or
(2) the motor vehicle was manufactured without safety belts.
Fines
(c) The penalty for violation of this section shall be as follows:
(1) $25.00 for a first violation;
(2) $50.00 for a second violation;
(3) $100.00 for third and subsequent violations
No Surcharges”

Current interpretation of the law
The current standard interpretation of the child passenger safety law is as follows:
1.	Children will remain in a rear facing that is not installed in front of an active airbag until the following two milestones have been passed:
•	The child is one year of age
AND
•	The child is twenty pounds
2.	Children between ages one and eight must be restrained in a child passenger safety restraint
3.	Children remain in a restraint until the following two milestones have been passed
•	The child is 8 years of age
AND
•	The child can pass the 5-step test to get out of a booster

Best practice
Best practice, according to the American Academy of Pediatrics and the National Highway Traffic Safety Administration, recommendations as currently followed by BeSeatSmart are as follows:
 Rear face children as long as possible, preferably to the upper rear facing weight limit; at LEAST to age two or three.
 Harness forward-facing children as long as possible; preferably to age 5 or six or to the weight or height limit of their seat.
 Use booster seats for kids until they pass the 5 step booster test – somewhere between ages 8 and 12.
 Use the seat belt for children who have passed the five-step booster test. At least age 8.
Children under age 13 should remain in the back seat.

BeSeatSmart programming

Programing includes but is not limited to, discounted car seat distribution, car seat fitting stations, car seat inspections, car seat recalls, special health care needs consultations, bus consultations, presentations for parents, caregivers and providers, train the trainer programs for schools and head start programs, displays, NHTSA's Child Passenger Safety Certification Training class, classes for hospitals and nurses.

See also
Child Safety Seat 
Infant Car Seat
Injury Prevention
National Child Passenger Safety Board
Safe Kids Worldwide
Vermont State Police

References

External links
 
 Vermont Governor's Highway Safety Program
 Vermont State Police
 Vermont DMV
 Safe Kids Worldwide
 National Child Passenger Safety Board

Government of Vermont
Child safety
Child-related organizations in the United States
Road safety organizations
Transportation in Vermont